Cityblooms is an urban farming technology company currently located in Santa Cruz, California. The company was founded by CEO Nick Halmos in 2001. In 2010 the company began developing modular hydroponic systems that leverage Internet-of-Things technology to grow premium produce for local distribution.

In 2014, Cityblooms partnered with Plantronics, Inc. to install a computer-controlled micro-farm at the company’s global headquarters in Santa Cruz. The project has been recognized for its innovation in reducing food miles and improving resource consumption.

References

Further reading
 
 

Urban agriculture
Technology companies based in California
Companies based in Santa Cruz, California
Companies established in 2001
2001 establishments in California